Suga, also known as Galim, Nyemnyem, and Nizaa, is a Mambiloid language of Cameroon.

References

Mambiloid languages
Languages of Cameroon